Felipe González González (28 January 1947 – 24 February 2023) was a Mexican politician and businessman. A member of the National Action Party (PAN), he was Governor of Aguascalientes from 1998 to 2004 and served in the Senate from 2006 to 2012.

Early years 
Felipe González was born in Aguascalientes, Aguascalientes, on 28 January 1947. His father died when he was 21, after which time he worked in the family business with his brothers.

Career

Business 
González served most of his professional life as an entrepreneur in various sectors. In 1991, he was president of the Business Center of Aguascalientes (CEA). He also served as president of the Employers' Confederation of Mexico (Coparmex) in Aguascalientes, and as chairman of the board of BBVA Bancomer and director of seven other banks. He served as president of the Sister City Committee, and was the founder and president of the Social Union of Businessmen in Mexico (USEM) in Aguascalientes. As president of the Association of Grocery Store Owners, González maintained a close relationship with the grocers of Aguascalientes.

Among his many awards was the Business Award of Merit in 1993, awarded by the Confederation of Chambers of Commerce nationwide.

Education 
González served as chairman of the board of the Autonomous University of Aguascalientes and of the National College of Professional Technical Education (CONALEP); he supported and promoted the creation of the Panamerican University's Bonaterra Campus in Aguascalientes.

Politics 
His first foray into politics was his nomination as the PAN's candidate for governor in Aguascalientes in 1998. After an intense campaign and an unprecedented mobilization of many population sectors in Aguascalientes, he secured a surprise victory over Institutional Revolutionary Party (PRI) candidate Héctor Hugo Olivares Ventura with 53% of the vote (against Olivares Ventura's 36%), making him the state's first governor not to come from the ranks of the PRI. During his term as governor, he focused on the politics of industrialization and sought to attract international investment into the state.

On 25 August 2004, he was appointed by President Vicente Fox as an assistant secretary at the Interior Ministry, a position where he remained until 9 January 2006. That year, he resigned to be nominated as a candidate for the Senate, representing the state of Aguascalientes, a position he was elected to until 2012 for the 60th and 61st legislatures. While in the Senate, he served as chairman of the Public Security Committee.

Personal life and death 
González was married to Cony Ramírez Zermeño, with whom he had four children. He was a Grand Knight of the Knights of Columbus. He was vice president of the board of Corazón Amigo, an organization that provides medical treatment to poor people.

González died in the city of Aguascalientes on 24 February 2023, at the age of 76.

References 

|-

1947 births
2023 deaths
National Action Party (Mexico) politicians
Mexican businesspeople
Senators of the LX and LXI Legislatures of Mexico
People from Aguascalientes City
Governors of Aguascalientes
20th-century Mexican politicians
21st-century Mexican politicians
Politicians from Aguascalientes